In Greek mythology, Geraestus or Geraistos (Ancient Greek: Γεραιστός) may refer to two personages:

 Geraestus, son of Zeus and brother of Taenarus and Calabrus. The three brothers were said to have sailed to Peloponnese and to have seized a portion of land there.
 Geraestus, a Cyclops on whose grave in Attica Hyacinthus of Lacedaemon had his daughters Aegleis, Antheis, Lytaea, and Orthaea were sacrificed.

Notes

References 

 Apollodorus, The Library with an English Translation by Sir James George Frazer, F.B.A., F.R.S. in 2 Volumes, Cambridge, MA, Harvard University Press; London, William Heinemann Ltd. 1921. . Online version at the Perseus Digital Library. Greek text available from the same website.
 Stephanus of Byzantium, Stephani Byzantii Ethnicorum quae supersunt, edited by August Meineike (1790-1870), published 1849. A few entries from this important ancient handbook of place names have been translated by Brady Kiesling. Online version at the Topos Text Project.

Children of Zeus
Demigods in classical mythology